Senator Easley may refer to:

Kevin Easley (born 1960), Oklahoma State Senate
Mack Easley (1916–2006), New Mexico State Senate
Mary Easley (fl. 2000s–2010s), Oklahoma State Senate